Manado Tua is a volcanic island in the Celebes Sea off the northeast coast of Sulawesi. The island is located on Bunaken National Park.

The name Manado comes from manadou or wanazou meaning "on the far coast" or "in the distance," which derived from Minahasan languages.  When the settlement on the island was relocated to Sulawesi, the name Manado was brought with it, and the island became referred to as Manado Tua ("Old Manado").

References

External links

Islands of Sulawesi
Landforms of North Sulawesi
Populated places in Indonesia